The 2015–16 French Guiana Division d'Honneur was the 43rd season of top-flight football in the French Guiana.

Table

References 

2015–16
2015–16 in Caribbean football leagues
1